Pascale Roberts (21 October 1930 – 26 October 2019) was a French film and television actress. She was a César Award nominee. In 1957, she married Pierre Mondy but they divorced a few years later.

Theater

Filmography

References

Bibliography
 Goble, Alan. The Complete Index to Literary Sources in Film. Walter de Gruyter, 1999.

External links

1930 births
2019 deaths
French film actresses
French television actresses
People from Boulogne-Billancourt
French people of English descent
Deaths from cancer in France